Fist of Fury is a 1995 Hong Kong martial arts television series adapted from the 1972 film of the same title. Produced by Asia Television (ATV) and STAR TV, the series starred Donnie Yen as Chen Zhen (Cantonese: Chan Zan), a character previously portrayed by Bruce Lee in Fist of Fury (1972) and Jet Li in Fist of Legend (1994). The series is also related to the 2010 film Legend of the Fist: The Return of Chen Zhen, in which Yen reprises his role.

Plot 
The series is set in early 20th-century China. Chan Zan travels to Shanghai with his younger sister, Siu-yin, in search of a new life after their hometown is destroyed by a group of bandits. Upon his arrival, he sees that Shanghai is divided into an international settlement under the control of foreign powers, while the martial artists' community in Shanghai is divided into many schools competing for the top position. The status reflects the state of China: the Chinese are pursuing their individual goals and fighting among themselves instead of uniting to drive out the overbearing foreign powers and regain sovereignty of their country. Fok Yuen-gap, the founder of Ching-mou School, is trying hard to persuade and influence the other schools to unite under a common purpose of defending China from foreign intrusion.

While earning a living as a coolie and rickshaw puller in Shanghai, Chan saves Yi-kiu, a famous singer, from some gangsters and receives an invitation to join the notorious Green Gang. He proves to be the best fighter in the gang and wins the favour of the boss, Choi Luk-kan. At the same time, he encounters the bandits who killed his family and they also happen to be the Green Gang's allies. Unable to convince the Green Gang to support him in taking revenge on the bandits, he learns a painful lesson to stay away from the gangs' illegal activities when the bandits kill his sister too. He leaves the Green Gang after avenging his sister and family.

Chan ultimately joins Ching-mou School after feeling impressed with Fok from their earlier encounters. He becomes Fok's favourite apprentice as he demonstrates a good understanding of Ching-mou's philosophy and founding principles, and hones his fighting skills under Fok's guidance. In the meantime, he meets and falls in love with Yumi, the daughter of Takeda Yukio, a Japanese consul. Their relationship is strained because they stand on opposing sides and come from strikingly different backgrounds. Besides, Ching-mou School strongly supports the local anti-Japanese movement, much to the Japanese's displeasure. Furthermore, Ishii Hideaki, Yumi's fiancé, has to come to Shanghai with his brother to start a karate dojo in the Hongkou District.

Meanwhile, Takeda takes charge of the Black Dragon Society's activities in Shanghai, including sabotaging the Chinese military in preparation for the Japanese to launch a future invasion of China. Knowing that Fok, whom the Chinese regard as a hero, must die in order for the Chinese people's morale to be crushed, Takeda sends a spy to infiltrate Ching-mou School and secretly poison Fok. Fok takes up a challenge from Ishii to fight in a lei tai match, but collapses halfway and dies due to the poisoning. Chan remains calm in the face of taunts and insults from Ching-mou's enemies after his master's death, and continues to lead his fellows to resist the Black Dragon Society. All members of the Ching-mou School ultimately die in the struggle, leaving Chan as the sole survivor.

After discovering that Takeda is planning to release a deadly virus in Shanghai and allow the Japanese to use that as an excuse to invade China, Chan breaks into the Black Dragon Society's base and takes down every fighter who stands in his way. He confronts Takeda and defeats him, but spares his life when Yumi begs him not to kill her father. Takeda commits suicide in humiliation after his defeat; Yumi, who was caught up in the fight and gravely wounded, dies of her injuries after Chan brings her back to Ching-mou School.

In the final scene, Ching-Mou School is surrounded by armed soldiers because the Japanese consulate has ordered Chan's arrest for the murder of Takeda. Chan speaks to the Chinese police inspector, who promises him to ensure Ching-mou School's survival, and then charges out with a flying kick at the soldiers as they open fire at him.

Cast 
 Donnie Yen as Chan Zan, the protagonist.
 Eddy Ko as Fok Yuen-gap, the founder of Ching-mou School.
 Joey Meng as Yumi, Takeda Yukio's daughter and Chan Zan's love interest.
 Kenny Lin-Teruyuki as Ishii Hideaki, Yumi's fiancé who wants to start a karate school in China.
 Yeung Chak-lam as Takeda Yukio, a Japanese consul and member of the Black Dragon Society.
 Berg Ng as Lau Chan-shing, the most senior Ching-mou student.
 Eric Wan as Choi Hok-fu, Choi Luk-kan's son who becomes a hon-gan.
 Leung Yat-ho as Leung Ha, Choi Luk-kan's bodyguard and Chan Zan's friend.
 Cong Shan as Yi-kiu, a singer and Leung Ha's love interest.
 Lau Chi-wing as Choi Luk-kan, the boss of the Green Gang.
 Sin Ho-ying as Ishii Hiroshi, Hideaki's brother and the master of the Hongkou dojo.
 Paw Hee-ching as Mrs Takeda, Takeda Yukio's wife.
 Ng Yuen-chun as Kuki, Ishii Hideaki's sensei.
 Mai Kei as Wu Yan, Takeda's secretary.
 Renee Dai as Siu-yin, Chan Zan's younger sister.
 Bobby Tsang as Yip Tai-cheung, a Ching-mou student.
 Lee Mo-king as Yip Tai-cheung's wife
 Ng Siu-ching as Ma Siu-ching, a Ching-mou student.
 Stephen Au as the Thai boxer
 Cheng Shu-fung as Hung Pao, a bandit chief who murders Chan Zan's family.
 Hung Yan-yan as Hung Fei, Hung Pao's brother.
 Philip Keung as Ah-chung, a coolie and Chan Zan's friend.
 Ken Lok as Cheung Hak-cheung, an ally of Ching-mou School.
 Lo Lieh as Cheung Chung-tong, a warlord and Cheung Hak-cheung's father.
 Hon Yee-sang as Choi Kam-fu, Choi Luk-kan's brother and a martial arts master.
 Simon Tsui as Uncle Kuen, the chairman of the Shanghai Martial Arts Association.
 Fung Kwok as Nung King-suen, a businessman and friend of Fok Yuen-gap who co-founded Ching-mou School.
 Kong To as Mayor Yim, the mayor of Shanghai.
 Mak Kei as Inspector Lo, the police inspector.
 Leung Kam-yim as Boss Ma, the Teochew businessman who hired the Thai boxer.
 Wai Lit as Fong Koi-tin, the vice chairman of the Shanghai Martial Arts Association.
 Kon San as Master Kam, a martial arts school master.
 Kwan Wai-lun as Cheng Tin, the master of the White Crane School.
 Ling Lai-man as Lo-fung, the cook of Ching-mou School.

External links
 Fist of Fury on Donnie Yen's official website

Hong Kong action television series
Martial arts television series
Asia Television original programming
1995 Hong Kong television series debuts
1995 Hong Kong television series endings
1990s Hong Kong television series
Live action television shows based on films
Cantonese-language television shows